Erasmus Hall may refer to: 

 Erasmus Hall High School in Flatbush, Brooklyn
 Erasmus D. Hall, merchant and legislator from Wisconsin